Victor Stelian Astafei  (born 6 July 1987) is a Romanian footballer who plays as a winger for Unirea Ungheni. He is also a rapper with the stage name Ăsta (This One). In January 2016 he released a hip hop album with 9 tracks called Sunt aici să mă satur (I am here to satiate).

Honours

HNK Gorica 
Druga HNL: 2017–18

CSM Târgu Mureș 
Liga IV – Mureș County: 2018–19

Discography
 2016 - Sunt aici să mă satur (I am here to satiate)

References

 5 OYUNCUYLA YOLLAR AYRILDI !, spor.haber3.com, 28 December 2015

External links
 
 

1987 births
Living people
Romanian footballers
Sportspeople from Târgu Mureș
People from Târgu Mureș
Association football midfielders
Liga I players
Liga II players
ASA 2013 Târgu Mureș players
ACS Sticla Arieșul Turda players
CS Gaz Metan Mediaș players
ASC Oțelul Galați players
FC Petrolul Ploiești players
FC Botoșani players
Sepsi OSK Sfântu Gheorghe players
ACS Viitorul Târgu Jiu players
CSM Reșița players
TFF First League players
Adana Demirspor footballers
Malaysia Super League players
Selangor FA players
First Football League (Croatia) players
HNK Gorica players
Romanian expatriate footballers
Romanian expatriate sportspeople in Turkey
Expatriate footballers in Turkey
Romanian expatriate sportspeople in Malaysia
Expatriate footballers in Malaysia
Romanian expatriate sportspeople in Croatia
Expatriate footballers in Croatia
Romanian rappers